Samuel Tombs is a British economist.  He is the Chief U.K. Economist of Pantheon Macroeconomics, an economic research firm located in Newcastle, England, with an office in White Plains, New York

After graduating from Oxford University with a BA in History and Economics and an MSc in Economics Samuel began working as a U.K. Economist at Capital Economics, a position he held for six years. During this time, Samuel won the Society of Business Economics' prestigious Rybczynski Prize for an article on quantitative easing in the UK.
In 2015, Samuel joined, Pantheon Macroeconomics, as  Chief U.K. Economist.

Tombs has been cited by Business Insider and the Sunday Times for his accuracy.

References

British economists
Academics of the University of Oxford
Living people
Alumni of the University of Oxford
Year of birth missing (living people)